Vorpal is a nonsense word from the 1872 poem "Jabberwocky" by Lewis Carroll.

Vorpal or vorpal sword may also refer to:
VORPAL, a computational plasma framework
Vorpal sword, a phrase from "Jabberwocky" also used in popular culture
Epyx Vorpal, a fastloading system for video games by Epyx Fast Load

See also 
Vorpahl